365: Repeat the Year is a 2020 South Korean television series starring Lee Joon-hyuk, Nam Ji-hyun, Kim Ji-soo and Yang Dong-geun. Based on the 2004 novel Repeat by Japanese writer Kurumi Inui, it aired on MBC TV from March 23 to April 28, 2020, every Monday and Tuesday at 20:55 (KST).

Synopsis
Ten people are given the possibility to go back in time, but mysterious events start to happen.

Cast

Main
 Lee Joon-hyuk as Ji Hyung-joo
A veteran detective of the National Police Agency for 7 years and the partner of Park Sun-ho. He "resets" his life by one year after his partner was killed by a criminal.
 Nam Ji-hyun as Shin Ga-hyun
A webtoon artist of the webcomic series "Hidden Killer" for the past 3 years. She "resets" her life by one year after she suffered from an accident that left her in a wheelchair.
 Kim Ji-soo as Lee Shin
A psychiatrist who has experienced the "reset" at least six times to save her daughter.

Supporting

People who "reset" their lives
 Yang Dong-geun as Bae Jung-tae
An ex-convict who "resets" his life to earn money for his sister.
 Lee Si-a as Seo Yeon-soo
One of the ten people who "reset" their life. She "resets" her life after feeling guilt for causing Shin Ga-hyun's accident that left her in a wheelchair. She is later killed by Park Sun-ho which was disguised as an accidental death on the stairs. 
 Yoon Joo-sang as Hwang No-seop
A cafe owner who is later revealed to be a professor in a hospital and the mastermind behind the "reset" project. He "resets" his life to experiment with the other nine candidates to see who survives. He is later arrested by Ji Hyung-joo in the next "reset". 
 Im Ha-ryong as Choi Kyung-man
A security guard. He "resets" his life to earn money from lottery wins for his wife. He is later killed by Park Sun-ho which was disguised as a heart attack. 
 Jung Min-sung as Cha Jeung-seok
A stockbroker. He "resets" his life to fix his mistakes on stock exchanges. He is later killed by Park Sun-ho which was disguised as a suicide.
 Ahn Seung-gyun as Go Jae-young
A pro-gamer and the son of the nominee for the Minister of Education. He "resets" his life to prevent his past from ruining his father's career. He is later killed by Park Sun-ho to frame his partner Ji Hyung-joo for murder.  
 Lee Yoo-mi as Kim Se-rin
A university student who suffers from Munchausen syndrome. She "resets" her life to make up with her boyfriend. She is later killed by Park Sun-ho and her body was abandoned in a manhole.

National Police Agency
 Ryu Tae-ho as Heo Jang-il
A Police Captain of the National Police Agency and Ji Hyung-joo's superior.
 Lee Sung-wook as Park Sun-ho
A Police Lieutenant of the National Police Agency and Ji Hyung-joo's partner. He is revealed to be the serial killer detective and started killing after being promoted to Lieutenant during his 12-year service. He is later arrested by Ji Hyung-joo in the next "reset". 
 Yoon Hye-ri as Jin Sa-kyung
A Police Lieutenant of the National Police Agency and Nam Soon-woo's partner.
 Ryeoun as Nam Soon-woo
A rookie police officer of the National Police Agency and Jin Sa-kyung's partner.

People around Shin Ga-hyun
 Min Do-hee as Min Joo-young
Shin Ga-hyun's best friend who cheated with Ga-hyun's boyfriend. She is later killed in a hit-and-run incident caused by Seo Yeon-soo's husband.
 Im Hyun-soo as Han Woo-jin
Shin Ga-hyun's boyfriend who cheated on her with Min Joo-young.

Others
 Kim Ha-kyung as So Hye-in
A florist and flower shop owner. She was a candidate for the "reset" but refused to participate after finding out she would not be pregnant at the time. She is later killed by Park Sun-Ho which was disguised as an arson case. 
 Sung Hyuk as Kim Dae-sung
Seo Yoon-Soo's husband and the suspect in the hit-and-run case that left Shin Ga-hyun's friend Min Joo-young dead.
 Baek Soo-jang as Oh Myung-chul
A criminal that killed Park Sun-ho before the "reset". He is later arrested by Ji Hyung-joo after the "reset".
 Lee Chung-mi as Kim Se-rin's sister
Kim Se-rin's older sister.
 Oh Hee-joon as Goo Seung-min

Special appearances
 Yoo Gun as a Ahn Gyeong-nam (Ep. 1–2)
A conman who underwent major surgery to avoid capture only to be arrested by Ji Hyung-joo by chance before the "reset".
 Jeon Seok-ho as Park Young-gil (Ep. 1–3)
A truck driver. He was killed during the "reset" since he was driving at the time.

Original soundtrack
Singles from the soundtrack of the series released from March 24 to April 21, 2020, under the record label of Kakao M:
Part 1

Part 2

Part 3

Part 4

Viewership
 In this table,  represent the lowest ratings and  represent the highest ratings.
 NR denotes that the drama did not rank in the top 20 daily programs on that date.
 N/A denotes that the rating is not known.

Notes

References

External links
  
 
 

MBC TV television dramas
Korean-language television shows
2020 South Korean television series debuts
2020 South Korean television series endings
South Korean fantasy television series
South Korean mystery television series
South Korean time travel television series
Television shows based on Japanese novels
Television series by HB Entertainment